Courtney Halverson (born June 14, 1989) is an American actress.

Life and career
Halverson was born in Orange County, California and graduated from high school at the age of 15.

She has been nominated twice for a Young Artist Award, once in 2006 for A Distant Shore and again in 2007 for Sleepwalk. She also starred in the thriller films Leprechaun's Revenge, The Hammer and Unfriended.

Filmography

Film

Television

References

External links 

 
 

1989 births
21st-century American actresses
Actresses from Orange County, California
American child actresses
American film actresses
American television actresses
Living people